Georgios Krestenitis (Greek: Γεώργιος Κρεστενίτης) was a Greek politician from Elis.
He descended from the famous Krestenitis family which had many politicians.  He was elected for the first time as a representative for Elis in the Greek parliament in 1879 and again in 1885, 1895, 1902 and 1905. He was elected as a representative for Achaea and Elis in 1912. He was the brother of Ioannis Krestenitis.

References
The first version of the article is translated and is based from the article at the Greek Wikipedia (el:Main Page))

19th-century births
20th-century deaths
Politicians from Elis
Greek MPs 1879–1881
Greek MPs 1881–1885
Greek MPs 1885–1887
Greek MPs 1902–1905
Greek MPs 1905–1906
Greek MPs 1912–1915
People from Elis